Bert Young was an English footballer.

Bert Young may also refer to:

Bert Young, husband of Caresse Crosby
Bert Young (actor) in Nutty but Nice

See also
Albert Young (disambiguation)
Robert Young (disambiguation)
Herbert Young (disambiguation)
Hubert Young